The little greenbul (Eurillas virens) is a species of the bulbul family of passerine birds. It is found in many parts of sub-Saharan Africa.

Taxonomy and systematics
The little greenbul was originally described in the genus Andropadus and was re-classified to the genus Eurillas in 2010. Alternatively, some authorities classify the little  greenbul in the genus Pycnonotus.

Subspecies
Five subspecies are recognized:
 E. v. amadoni - (Dickerman, 1997): Found on Bioko
 Upper Guinea little greenbul (E. v. erythroptera) - (Hartlaub, 1858): Found from Gambia to southern Nigeria
 E. v. virens - (Cassin, 1857): Found from western Cameroon to southern Sudan, western Kenya, southern Democratic Republic of Congo and northern Angola
 E. v. zanzibarica - Pakenham, 1935: Found on Zanzibar
 E. v. zombensis - (Shelley, 1894): Found from south-eastern Democratic Republic of Congo and northern Zambia to south-eastern Kenya and northern Mozambique. Includes Hall's greenbul (Eurillas virens [hallae]), named after the British ornithologist Pat Hall and which is only known from a single specimen taken in the Democratic Republic of the Congo. Hall's greenbul may be a melanistic form of E. v. zombensis.

Description
The little greenbul is a small bird reaching a total length of about 187 mm, with wings of about 80 mm and tail of about 77 mm. The upper tail and wings are brown, while breast and flanks are pale grey-greenish (hence the Latin name virens of this species, meaning "green"). The bill is brown, the iris is brown and the feet are light yellow-brown.

Distribution and habitat
The little greenbul is found in western, central and eastern Africa. 
Its natural habitats are subtropical or tropical dry forests, subtropical or tropical moist lowland forests, and moist savanna.

Behaviour and ecology
The little greenbul was the subject of a study regarding the impact of ecotones on biodiversity.

References

 Andropadus virens.   2006 IUCN Red List of Threatened Species.  Downloaded on 24 July 2007.
 BirdLife International
 Dr. G. Carmichael Low - Bulletin of the british ornithologist club – Vol LV.

little greenbul
Birds of the Gulf of Guinea
little greenbul
Taxonomy articles created by Polbot